Rayamundanpatti is a village in the Thanjavur taluk of Thanjavur district, Tamil Nadu, India.

Demographics 

As per the 2001 census, Rayamundanpatti had a total population of 1413 with 711 males and 702 females. The sex ratio was 987. The literacy rate was 55.28.

References 

 

Villages in Thanjavur district